James Joseph Lawson (born 11 December 1947) is an English former professional footballer who played as a winger in the Football League for Middlesbrough, Huddersfield Town and Halifax Town, where he later became player-manager.

Personal life
Lawson was a personal tailor when he was at Huddersfield Town in the 1970s. He is now a salesman for STILL Materials Handling Ltd.
His son Ian was also a professional footballer.

References

1947 births
Living people
Footballers from Middlesbrough
English footballers
Association football forwards
Middlesbrough F.C. players
Huddersfield Town A.F.C. players
Halifax Town A.F.C. players
English Football League players
English football managers
Halifax Town A.F.C. managers
Association football midfielders